Cryin' Time is an album by blues pianist and vocalist Otis Spann recorded in Chicago in 1968 and released by the Vanguard label.

Reception

AllMusic reviewer Mark Allan stated "Sweet Giant of the Blues, a 1969 session for Bluestime released in 1970, is one of his very last albums and if it can't be called definitive, it's nevertheless a robust example of his gifts.  ... This is loose and unpredictable in a predictable fashion, delving into a little bit of Latin beats and rhumba and a whole lot of rock & roll ... Spann seems to seize the changes and enjoys playing with the band, never trying to play against his support".[relevance?]

Track listing
All compositions by Otis Spann except where noted
 "Home to Mississippi" − 3:26
 "Blues Is a Botheration" − 4:02
 "You Said You'd Be on Time" (Spann, George Spink) − 4:46
 "Cryin' Time" − 3:11
 "Blind Man" (Traditional) − 3:18
 "Some Day" − 4:35
 "Twisted Snake" − 3:02
 "Green Flowers" (McKinley Morganfield) − 3:44
 "The New Boogaloo" − 2:09
 "Mule Kicking in My Stall" − 3:30

Personnel
Otis Spann − vocals, piano, organ
Barry Melton − lead guitar
Luther Johnson − second guitar
Jos Davidson − bass
Lonnie Taylor − drums
Lucille Spann − backing vocals (tracks 5 & 6)
Technical
Michael Chechik - co-producer

References

1969 albums
Otis Spann albums
albums produced by Samuel Charters
Vanguard Records albums